John Griffin (May 17, 1956) is an American former college basketball player and coach at Saint Joseph's and Siena.

Coaching career
After playing for the Hawks from 1974 to 1978, Griffin returned as an assistant coach in 1980, staying for two seasons before taking the head coaching job at Siena. In four seasons at Siena, Griffin compiled a 70–44 record and earned ECAC North Coach of the Year honors in 1985. After leaving Siena in 1986 to enter the private sector, Griffin returned to coaching by taking the helm of his alma mater for five seasons, amassing a 75–69 record and two NIT appearances before being replaced by his assistant, Phil Martelli.

Personal life
Both of Griffin's sons played college basketball and are also current coaches. Son John played basketball at Bucknell and is a current assistant coach at the school. Griffin's other son Matt played at Rider and Boston University and recently became assistant coach at University of Albany after 5 years as the head boys basketball coach at Roman Catholic High School in Philadelphia.

Head coaching record

References 

1956 births
Living people
American men's basketball coaches
American men's basketball players
Saint Joseph's Hawks men's basketball coaches
Saint Joseph's Hawks men's basketball players
Siena Saints men's basketball coaches